Chase County (county code CS) is a county located in the U.S. state of Kansas. As of the 2020 census, the county population was 2,572. Its county seat and most populous city is Cottonwood Falls.  The center of population of Kansas is located in Chase County, about four miles north of Strong City.

History

Early history

For many millennia, the Great Plains of North America was inhabited by nomadic Native Americans. From the 16th century to 18th century, the Kingdom of France claimed ownership of large parts of North America. In 1762, after the French and Indian War, France secretly ceded New France to Spain, per the Treaty of Fontainebleau. In 1802, Spain returned most of the land to France, but keeping title to about 7,500 square miles.

In 1803, most of the land for modern day Kansas was acquired by the United States from France as part of the 828,000 square mile Louisiana Purchase for 2.83 cents per acre. In 1848, after the Mexican–American War, the Treaty of Guadalupe Hidalgo with Spain brought into the United States all or part of land for ten future states, including southwest Kansas. In 1854, the Kansas Territory was organized, then in 1861 Kansas became the 34th U.S. state.

19th century
In 1806, Zebulon Pike led the Pike Expedition westward from St Louis, Missouri, of which part of their journey followed the Cottonwood River through modern Chase County.

In 1859, Chase County was established within the Kansas Territory.

In 1871, the Atchison, Topeka and Santa Fe Railway extended a main line from Emporia to Newton.  In 1887, Atchison, Topeka and Santa Fe Railway built a branch line from Neva (3 miles west of Strong City) to Superior, Nebraska.  This branch line connected Strong City, Neva, Rockland, Diamond Springs, Burdick, Lost Springs, Jacobs, Hope, Navarre, Enterprise, Abilene, Talmage, Manchester, Longford, Oak Hill, Miltonvale, Aurora, Huscher, Concordia, Kackley, Courtland, Webber, Superior.  At some time, the line from Neva to Lost Springs was pulled but the right of way has not been abandoned.  This branch line was originally called "Strong City and Superior line" but later the name was shortened to the "Strong City line".  In 1996, the Atchison, Topeka and Santa Fe Railway merged with Burlington Northern Railroad and renamed to the current BNSF Railway.

The south-western border one mile "notch" into Marion County was established under unusual circumstances.  A murder had occurred and Marion County didn't want to have the trial, so a section one mile wide and eighteen miles long was permanently ceded to Chase County to ensure the murder had occurred there.

20th century
In 1931, Notre Dame coach Knute Rockne died in a plane crash a few miles southwest of Bazaar, in Chase County, Kansas.

In 1991, the county was the subject of the book: PrairyErth: (A Deep Map).

In 1996, the Tallgrass Prairie National Preserve was established in the county.

Historical markers
 Landmark of Distinction - The Chase County Courthouse.
 Chase County and The Bluestem Pasture Region of Kansas.
 The Bluestem Pasture Region of Kansas.
 W. B. Strong Memorial Railroad Park.

Historical maps

Geography

Chase County is centrally located in the eastern half of the state in the Flint Hills geologic region.  It's located in the Neosho River drainage basin.

Adjacent counties
 Morris County (north)
 Lyon County (east)
 Greenwood County (southeast)
 Butler County (southwest)
 Marion County (west)

National protected area
 Tallgrass Prairie National Preserve

Major highways
Sources:  National Atlas, U.S. Census Bureau
 Interstate 35 All of I-35 in Chase County is part of the Kansas Turnpike and inaccessible to the general public from within the county. The closest access points are via U.S. Route 50 in Emporia or Kansas Highway 177 in Cassoday. There is a private interchange located southeast of Bazaar for loading cattle. The overpass names the interchange the "Bazaar Cattle Crossing".
 U.S. Route 50
 K-150
 K-177

Demographics

2000 census
As of the 2000 census, there were 3,030 people, 1,246 households, and 817 families residing in the county.  The population density was 4 people per square mile (2/km2).  There were 1,529 housing units at an average density of 2 per square mile (1/km2).  The racial makeup of the county was 96.90% White, 1.02% Black or African American, 0.56% Native American, 0.13% Asian, 0.56% from other races, and 0.83% from two or more races. Hispanic or Latino of any race were 1.75% of the population.

There were 1,246 households, out of which 28.30% had children under the age of 18 living with them, 54.60% were married couples living together, 7.60% had a female householder with no husband present, and 34.40% were non-families. 31.10% of all households were made up of individuals, and 14.90% had someone living alone who was 65 years of age or older. The average household size was 2.34 and the average family size was 2.92.

In the county, the population was spread out, with 24.10% under the age of 18, 6.50% from 18 to 24, 26.60% from 25 to 44, 24.10% from 45 to 64, and 18.70% who were 65 years of age or older.  The median age was 40 years. For every 100 females, there were 103.90 males.  For every 100 females age 18 and over, there were 99.40 males.

The median income for a household in the county was $32,656, and the median income for a family was $39,848. Males had a median income of $27,402 versus $21,528 for females. The per capita income for the county was $17,422.  About 4.10% of families and 8.60% of the population were below the poverty line, including 10.00% of those under age 18 and 6.30% of those age 65 or over.

Government

Presidential elections
Chase County is a Republican stronghold. The last Democrat to carry this county was Franklin D. Roosevelt in 1936.

Laws
Following amendment to the Kansas Constitution in 1986, the county remained a prohibition, or "dry", county until 1988, when voters approved the sale of alcoholic liquor by the individual drink with a 30% food sales requirement.

Education

Unified school districts
 Chase County USD 284 (most of the county)

School district office in neighboring county
 Centre USD 397
 Peabody–Burns USD 398
 Marion–Florence USD 408

Communities

Cities
 Cedar Point
 Cottonwood Falls
 Elmdale
 Matfield Green
 Strong City

Unincorporated places
 Bazaar
 Clements
 Saffordville
 Toledo
 Wonsevu

Ghost towns

 Birley
 Clover Cliff
 Elk
 Ellinor
 Gladstone
 Homestead
 Hymer
 Morgan
 Neva
 Rockland
 Rural
 Thurman

Townships
Chase County is divided into nine townships. None of the cities within the county are considered governmentally independent, and all figures for the townships include those of the cities. In the following table, the population center is the largest city (or cities) included in that township's population total, if it is of a significant size.

In popular culture
Made famous by William Least Heat-Moon's epic book PrairyErth: A Deep Map (1991).

NRHP sites
The following sites in Chase County are listed on the National Register of Historic Places:

See also
 National Register of Historic Places listings in Chase County, Kansas
 Cottonwood River and Great Flood of 1951

References

Further reading

 PrairyErth (A Deep Map); William Least Heat-Moon; Mariner Books; 692 pages; 1991; . (archive)
 Clover Cliff Ranch: The Land and the People; Paul G. Jantzen; Partnership Book Services; 1997.
 Chase County Centennial 1872-1972 / Chase County Courthouse Centennial; Centennial Committee; 1972.
 Chase County - Its Past, Present, and Future; Chase County Leader; May 28, 1914.
 Plat Book of Chase County, Kansas; North West Publishing Co; 39 pages; 1901.

External links

 
 Chase County - Directory of Public Officials
Maps
 Chase County Maps: Current, Historic, KDOT
 Kansas Highway Maps: Current, Historic, KDOT
 Kansas Railroad Maps: Current, 1996, 1915, KDOT and Kansas Historical Society

 
Kansas counties
1859 establishments in Kansas Territory
Emporia, Kansas micropolitan area